Deuterotinea is a genus of moths in the Eriocottidae family.

Species
 Deuterotinea auronitens Lucas, 1956
 Deuterotinea axiurga Meyrick, 1922
 Deuterotinea balcanica Zagulajev, 1972
 Deuterotinea casanella Eversmann, 1844
 Deuterotinea instabilis Meyrick, 1924
 Deuterotinea longipennis Erschoff, 1874
 Deuterotinea macropodella Erschoff, 1874
 Deuterotinea maracandica Zagulajev, 1988
 Deuterotinea palaestinensis Rebel, 1901
 Deuterotinea stschetkini Zagulajev, 1972

Former species
 Deuterotinea decoratella de Joannis, 1917
 Deuterotinea nervatella de Joannis, 1917
 Deuterotinea paradoxella Staudinger, 1859
 Deuterotinea tauridella (Guenée, 1845)

References

Eriocottidae
Moth genera